The 2010 Crystal Skate of Romania was the 11th edition of an annual senior-level international figure skating competition held in Romania. It was held between November 18 and 21, 2010 in Brașov. Skaters competed in the disciplines of men's singles and ladies' singles.

Results

Men

Ladies

References

External links
 https://web.archive.org/web/20110403065821/http://isu.sportcentric.net/db/files/serve.php?id=2322

Crystal Skate Of Romania, 2010